Francesco Bossa (born 26 May 1990) is an Italian footballer who plays as a midfielder.

Career
Born in Naples, Campania, Bossa started his career at Sicilian club Messina. On 17 January 2007 he breached his youth contract to join Swiss club Bellinzona, located in the Italian speaking canton. On 31 January 2008 Bossa and teammate Alessandro Gherardi and Carlo De Micco were returned to Italy for Udinese, AlbinoLeffe and Triestina respectively. Bossa was a player for the reserve until 2010. He also suspended for one month due to his contract dispute with Messina.

In July 2010 Bossa and Rosario Licata were left for Como. In July 2011 he was loaned to U.S. Grosseto F.C., along with Giovanni Formiconi and Federico Gerardi. Bossa wore no.16 shirt for the first team.

References 

Italian footballers
A.C.R. Messina players
AC Bellinzona players
Udinese Calcio players
Como 1907 players
F.C. Grosseto S.S.D. players
Association football midfielders
Serie B players
Serie C players
Footballers from Naples
1990 births
Living people